Guatemala competed at the 2020 Summer Paralympics in Tokyo, Japan, from 24 August to 5 September 2021. This was their eighth appearance at the Summer Paralympics since 1976.

Competitors 
The following is the list of number of competitors participating in the Games:

Athletics 
DNA: Did not advance
Men's field

Women's track

See also 
 Guatemala at the Paralympics
 Guatemala at the 2020 Summer Olympics

External links 
 Paralympics website 

Nations at the 2020 Summer Paralympics
2020
Summer Paralympics